Psilander may refer to:

 , several ships of the Swedish Navy

People with the surname
 Valdemar Psilander (1884–1917), Danish actor
 Gustaf von Psilander (1669–1738), Swedish admiral